Henry Paget, 1st Earl of Uxbridge  (13 January 166330 August 1743), of Beaudesert, Staffordshire, and  West Drayton, Middlesex, was a British landowner and Tory politician who sat in the English and British House of Commons from 1695 until 1712 when he was raised to the peerage as Baron Burton as one of Harley's Dozen. He was a Hanoverian Tory, supportive of the Hanoverian Succession.

Personal life

Paget was the son of William Paget, 6th Baron Paget, and his first wife Frances Pierrepont, daughter of Hon. Francis Pierrepoint She was a granddaughter of Robert Pierrepont, 1st Earl of Kingston-upon-Hull.

Career
Paget was appointed a deputy lieutenant for Middlesex on 6 April 1689 and Staffordshire on 14 May 1689. He was elected Member of Parliament for Staffordshire on 7 November 1695 as a Tory. In 1702 he was made a deputy lieutenant for Buckinghamshire.

On 30 April 1704 Paget was appointed one of the Council advising the Lord High Admiral, Prince George of Denmark, and served until the Prince's death on 28 October 1708. He was also a Lord Commissioner of the Treasury between 10 August 1710 and 30 May 1711. On 13 June 1711 he was appointed Captain of the Yeomen of the Guard, being made a Privy Counsellor the next day and being raised to the House of Lords as Baron Burton, of Burton in the County of Stafford, on 1 January 1712. On 26 February 1713 he succeeded his father as 7th Baron Paget of Beaudesert, and was also appointed to succeed him as Lord Lieutenant of Staffordshire.

On 1 May 1714 he was appointed Envoy Extraordinary to the Elector of Hanover, but refused to go unless he was made an Earl, which Queen Anne refused. However, when the Elector succeeded as King George I of Great Britain on 1 August, he raised Paget in the peerage as Earl of Uxbridge in the County of Middlesex, on 19 October 1714, and appointed him to the new Privy Council, 16 November 1714. In 1727, the Town of Uxbridge, Massachusetts Colony, was named in honour of Henry Paget, First Earl of Uxbridge.

Later life
In 1715 Lord Uxbridge ceased to be Captain of the Yeomen of the Guard and Lord Lieutenant, and took on the post of Recorder of Lichfield, in which he served until his death. In 1740, he became a justice of the peace for Cambridgeshire.

Personal life
In 1686, he married Mary Catesby, the eldest daughter and co-heiress of Thomas Catesby of Whiston and Ecton and Margaret Samwell (a daughter of Richard Samwell of Upton). Together, they were the parents of:

 Thomas Catesby Paget, styled Lord Paget, who married Lady Elizabeth Egerton, youngest daughter of John Egerton, 3rd Earl of Bridgewater and Lady Jane Paulet (a daughter of Charles Paulet, 1st Duke of Bolton).
 Lady Mary Paget, who married Stephen Metcalfe.

Lady Uxbridge died suddenly on 3 November 1734, and was buried at West Drayton on 9 November. On 7 June 1739 Lord Uxbridge remarried Elizabeth Bagot (b. 1674). She was a member of another Staffordshire county family, the daughter of the late Sir Walter Bagot, 3rd Baronet (to whose Parliamentary seat Uxbridge had succeeded in 1695). He was seventy-six and she was sixty-nine.

The Earl of Uxbridge died at West Drayton on 30 August 1743, aged eighty. As his son Thomas, Lord Paget had predeceased him, on 4 February 1742, he was succeeded in his titles by his grandson Henry, who became the 2nd Earl. His widow Lady Uxbridge died on 2 September 1749.

References

Sources
 
 
 Haydn's Book of Dignities
 Colley, Linda. In Defiance of Oligarchy: The Tory Party 1714-60. Cambridge University Press, 1985.

|-

1663 births
1743 deaths
Paget, Henry
Paget, Henry
Paget, Henry
Deputy Lieutenants of Buckinghamshire
Deputy Lieutenants of Middlesex
Deputy Lieutenants of Staffordshire
Earls of Uxbridge
Peers of Great Britain created by Queen Anne
Lord-Lieutenants of Staffordshire
Lords of the Admiralty
Paget, Henry
Members of the Privy Council of Great Britain
Paget, Henry
Henry
English MPs 1695–1698
English MPs 1698–1700
English MPs 1701
English MPs 1701–1702
English MPs 1702–1705
English MPs 1705–1707